Zinaida Petrovna Ziberova (born 1909) was a pianist, conductor, and composer who was born in Darmstadt, Germany, and lived most of her life in Rostov-on-Don, Russia. Ziberova moved to Rostov-on-Don in 1925, where she attended music school and studied piano with A. Alper, graduating in 1928. She worked as a pianist in nightclubs from 1925 to 1929. Ziberova studied composition with N. Heifetz, I. Gottweiter, and E. Broomberg in 1931. From 1929 to 1941, she conducted and directed amateur theatrical productions, and participated in local government.

Works
Her compositions include:

Ballet 
Buratino (1959)

Chamber 
Nocturne (1946)
Plyasovaya (1946)

Operetta 
Kot v sapogakh

Orchestra 
Rodnoi gorod, march (for wind orchestra; 1941)
Tam gole shli boi (symphonic poem; 1950)

Theatre 
Ziberova composed approximately 150 pieces for theatre, including:
Aull Gidzhe (Shestakov; 1930)
Ignoramus (D. Fonvizin; 1933)
The Misanthrope (Molière; 1934)
William Tell (Schiller; 1935)

Vocal 
Ziberova arranged many folksongs and composed over 120 original songs, including:
Osvobozhdennomu gorodu (E. Shirman; 1941)
Zhdi menya (K. Simonov; 1941)
Don (A. Pushkin; 1940)
Eleven songs (V. Shak; 1948-1953)
Lesnaya tropa, cycle of 12 songs (A. Olenicha-Gneneko; 1952)
Marsh studentov (E. Zinovev; 1949)
Pesnaya o Lenine (D. Althausen; 1952)

References

Musicians from Darmstadt
1909 births
Year of death missing
German emigrants to the Soviet Union
German women composers
Women conductors (music)